Barney Maddison (born 22 February 1989) is an English rugby union player who plays for Ealing Trailfinders in the RFU Championship.

He originally played for Rotherham Titans who were in the RFU Championship, making his first-team debut against Bedford Blues in a Championship match in September 2011. He captained the Titans during the 2015–16 season at Vallis Way.

Maddison's first season with London Welsh, scoring one try in 13 matches since joining from Rotherham Titans in 2016. In December 2016, Maddison left Welsh with immediate effect to sign an 18-month deal with Ealing Trailfinders in the Greene King IPA Championship, with the lock managing 1 try from 12 appearances in that time.

On 18 May 2018, Maddison left Trailfinders to sign for London Irish from the 2018–19 season. He made his debut against his previous club Ealing Trailfinders in a Championship match back in September 2018. On 4 July 2020, Maddison re-signed with Ealing Trailfinders on a long-term deal from the 2020–21 season.

References

External links
ESPN Profile
Its Rugby Profile
Ultimate Rugby Profile

1989 births
Living people
Ealing Trailfinders Rugby Club players
English rugby union players
London Irish players
Rugby union players from Hexham
Rugby union locks